Tikorangi is a settlement in Taranaki, New Zealand. Waitara lies about 6 kilometres to the north-west. The Waitara River flows to the west of the settlement, with the Bertrand Road suspension bridge providing access to the other side. The Mangaemiemi or Otaraua Marae and Te Ahi Kaa Roa meeting house are a local meeting place for Otaraua, a hapū of Te Āti Awa.

Tikorangi was the site of the Tikorangi Redoubt, a British military post set up in June 1865 during the Second Taranaki War. 

Tikorangi's Jury Garden has been awarded the highest rating by the New Zealand Gardens Trust: Garden of National Significance. It is open to the public for part of the year.

The Bertrand Road suspension bridge connects Tikorangi to Huirangi.

Demographics

The statistical area had a population of 1,902 at the 2018 New Zealand census, an increase of 126 people (7.1%) since the 2013 census, and an increase of 312 people (19.6%) since the 2006 census. There were 744 households, comprising 990 males and 912 females, giving a sex ratio of 1.09 males per female. The median age was 45.8 years (compared with 37.4 years nationally), with 345 people (18.1%) aged under 15 years, 264 (13.9%) aged 15 to 29, 936 (49.2%) aged 30 to 64, and 360 (18.9%) aged 65 or older.

Ethnicities were 90.2% European/Pākehā, 18.3% Māori, 0.9% Pacific peoples, 0.9% Asian, and 2.2% other ethnicities. People may identify with more than one ethnicity.

The percentage of people born overseas was 9.3, compared with 27.1% nationally.

Although some people chose not to answer the census's question about religious affiliation, 56.5% had no religion, 32.6% were Christian, 0.6% had Māori religious beliefs, 0.2% were Hindu, 0.3% were Muslim, 0.3% were Buddhist and 1.4% had other religions.

Of those at least 15 years old, 204 (13.1%) people had a bachelor's or higher degree, and 339 (21.8%) people had no formal qualifications. The median income was $33,600, compared with $31,800 nationally. 264 people (17.0%) earned over $70,000 compared to 17.2% nationally. The employment status of those at least 15 was that 825 (53.0%) people were employed full-time, 234 (15.0%) were part-time, and 42 (2.7%) were unemployed.

Education
Tikorangi School is a coeducational contributing primary (years 1–6) school with a roll of  students as of  The school opened in 1867.

Notes

Populated places in Taranaki
New Plymouth District